The Catholic Church in Serbia consists of several Latin Catholic and one Eastern Catholic jurisdictions. The Latin Catholic hierarchy consists of one ecclesiastical province with archdiocese centered in national capital city of Belgrade, with two suffragan dioceses, in Subotica and Zrenjanin. Also, there is the separate Diocese of Syrmia, suffragan to the Archdiocese of Đakovo-Osijek (metropolitan province centered in Croatia). The Diocese of Prizren-Pristina, centered in Prizren, is exempt and directly subjected to the Holy See. The only Eastern Catholic jurisdiction is the Greek Catholic Eparchy of Ruski Krstur of the Byzantine Rite. There is also an Apostolic Nunciature as papal diplomatic representation in Serbia.

Current Latin Dioceses

Ecclesiastical Province of Beograd 
 Metropolitan Archdiocese of Belgrade
 Diocese of Subotica 
 Diocese of Zrenjanin

Ecclesiastical Province of Đakovo–Osijek (in Croatia) 
 Diocese of Syrmia

Exempt and immediately subjected to the Holy See 
 Roman Catholic Diocese of Prizren-Pristina (for Kosovo), elevated in 2018 from an apostolic administration

Eastern Catholic jurisdiction 
 Greek Catholic Church of Croatia and Serbia sui iuris (Byzantine Rite)
 Greek Catholic Eparchy of Ruski Krstur, elevated in 2018 from an apostolic exarchate

Titular dioceses on the territory of Archdiocese
 Naissus (see), titular see.

See also 
 International Bishops' Conference of Saints Cyril and Methodius
 List of Catholic dioceses (structured view)

Notes

References

Sources and external links 
 Conference of the Saints Cyril and Methodius
 Catholic Archdiocese of Belgrade
 Bishopric of Subotica
 Bishopric of Zrenjanin
 Catholic-Hierarchy entry
 Bishopric of Syrmia
 Catholic Hierarchy: Apostolic Administration of Prizren
 Apostolic Exarchate of Serbia and Montenegro (2003-2013) on Catholic Hierarchy
 Apostolic Exarchate of Serbia (2013-) on Catholic Hierarchy
 GCatholic.org - data for all sections
 Radio Maria of Serbia

Serbia
Catholic dioceses